Diocese of Mthatha or (formerly) Diocese of Umtata may refer to the following ecclesiastical jurisdictions with episcopal see in Mthatha, (Eastern) Cape province, South Africa:

 Anglican Diocese of Mthatha
 Roman Catholic Diocese of Mthatha (alias Umtata)